Luc Le Vaillant (born 1958, Landivisiau) is a French journalist. Since 2000, he runs the "Portrait" section of the daily Libération.

Biography 
The son of a general practitioner and a mother professor of Italian and French, he is the eldest of a family of six children. He spent his childhood at Plougasnou where he became passionate about sailing, leading him to frequent the French Olympic team.

He was director of the French Committee for the America's Cup presided by Jean Glavany and then joined the cabinet of Louis Le Pensec, Minister of the DOM-TOM, to write his speeches.

In 1990, Luc Le Vaillant joined the sports department of Libération and in 1995 the "Portrait" section of which he became responsible five years later. Since January 2013, he has been holding a column entitled "Ré / jouissances" every Tuesday.

In 1998, he received the Albert Londres Prize in the press category.

Prizes and awards 
 1997: Prix Mumm
 1998: Prix Albert-Londres

Bibliography 
2014:

References

External links 
 Articles written by Luc Le Vaillant in Libération
 Luc Le Vaillant, le dernier libertaire on OJIM
 Luc Le Vaillant présente "Portraits Libération 2010 2014" o YouTube
 Luc Le Vaillant on France Culture

20th-century French journalists
21st-century French journalists
Albert Londres Prize recipients
1958 births
People from Finistère
Living people